Agios Dimitrios is a village in the Limassol District of Cyprus, located 6 km south of Prodromos.

References

Communities in Limassol District